Duchal House is an 18th-century mansion and estate near Kilmacolm, Scotland. It is located in Inverclyde, in the former county of Renfrewshire. Duchal was acquired by the Porterfield family in the 16th century. The present house was built in 1710 and extended in 1768. It was owned by Lord Maclay until 2018. The house is protected as a category A listed building, and the grounds are included in the Inventory of Gardens and Designed Landscapes in Scotland, the national listing of significant gardens.

History
The lands of Duchal were held by the Lyle family from the 13th century, based at Duchal Castle, now a ruin. In 1544 Duchal was acquired by John Porterfield, and in 1710 his descendant Alexander Porterfield constructed a new house. This building now forms the south range of the present house. Formal gardens had been laid out by around 1750. The house was extended eastward by Boyd Porterfield in 1768.

In 1854 the estate was acquired by the Shaw-Stewarts of Ardgowan for use as a shooting lodge. Duchal was sold in 1910, and in 1915 was purchased by the shipowner Joseph Paton Maclay, 1st Baron Maclay, whose family occupied the house until 2018.

See also
 List of Category A listed buildings in Inverclyde 
 List of listed buildings in Kilmacolm, Inverclyde

References

External links
 
 Video of Duchal Castle

Listed houses in Scotland
Houses completed in 1768
Category A listed buildings in Inverclyde
Inventory of Gardens and Designed Landscapes
1768 establishments in Scotland